The 2008 Cardiff Council election was held on 1 May, along with the 2008 Welsh local elections. All 75 seats of Cardiff Council were contested, with it remaining in no overall control. It was preceded by the 2004 election and followed by the 2012 election

Overview
Candidates from nine parties as well as Independents stood for election. Of these Liberal Democrat, Conservative, Labour, Plaid Cymru and Independent councillors were elected.

|}

The changes in party councillors in this table differs from that list by the BBC because it is based purely on changes from the 2004 election, not taking into account mid-term party defections or by-elections

Outcome
After this election the council remained in no overall control with the Liberal Democrats remaining the largest party on the council, after a net gain of seats. All parties gained seats, other than Labour who halved their seat share from the previous election. Three Independents were elected for the first time since 1999, although two of these were former Conservative councillors that defected during the previous term.

The Liberal Democrats formed a coalition with the Plaid Cymru group to lead the council; Liberal Democrat Rodney Berman became council leader, with Neil McEvoy of Plaid Cymru and Judith Woodman of the Liberal Democrats becoming deputy leaders. The Conservative Party emerged as the official opposition on the council, after they became the second largest party.

Ward results
The ward results listed below are based on the changes from the 2004 elections, not taking into account any mid-term by-elections or party defections.

* = sitting councillor in this ward prior to election

Adamsdown (2 seats)

Butetown (1 seat)

Caerau (2 seats)

Canton (3 seats)

Cathays (4 seats)

Creigiau and St. Fagans (1 seat)

Cyncoed (3 seats)

Ely (3 seats)

Fairwater (3 seats)

Gabalfa (2 seats)

Grangetown (3 seats)

Heath (3 seats)

Lisvane (1 seat)

Llandaff (2 seats)

Llandaff North (2 seats)

Llanishen (4 seats)

Llanrumney (3 seats)

Pentwyn (4 seats)

Pentyrch (1 seat)

Penylan (3 seats)

Plasnewydd (4 seats)

Pontprennau and Old St. Mellons (2 seats)

Radyr (1 seat)

Rhiwbina (3 seats)

Riverside (3 seats)

Rumney (2 seats)

Splott (3 seats)

Trowbridge (3 seats)

Whitchurch and Tongwynlais (4 seats)

By-elections between 2008 and 2012

Pentyrch

The by-election was called following the resignation of Cllr. Simon Roberts.

Riverside

The by-election was called following the resignation of Cllr. Gwenllian Lansdown.

References

External links
 BBC News: Elections 2008, Cardiff Council results
 Cardiff Council

Cardiff
2008
2000s in Cardiff